Djelfa is a province (wilaya) of Algeria.  Its capital is Djelfa.
It was first established by the administrative reorganization of 1974, and is home to over 1.2 million inhabitants. Localities in this province include Tadmit, El Khemis, and Selmana.

History
The province was created from parts of Batna (département), Médéa (département), Oasis department and Tiaret department in 1974.

Administrative division
The province is made up of 12 districts, which are further divided into 36 communes or municipalities.

Districts
 Aïn El Ibil
 Aïn Oussera
 Birine
 Charef
 Dar Chioukh
 Djelfa
 El Idrissia
 Faidh El Botma
 Had Sahary
 Hassi Bahbah
 Messaâd
 Sidi Ladjel

Communes

References

External links
 Official website
 Djelfa Forums
 Nfaes network Portal & Forums 
 Djelfa - la capitale de la Steppe

 
Provinces of Algeria
States and territories established in 1974